Olivia Borlée (born 10 April 1986 in Woluwe-Saint-Lambert) is a retired Belgian sprinter who specialized in the 200 metres. Her personal best time in the 200 is 22.98 seconds, achieved in July 2006 in Brussels. She has a personal best of 11.39 seconds in the 100 metres. She won a gold medal in the 4x100 m relay at the 2008 Summer Olympics with teammates Hanna Mariën, Élodie Ouédraogo, and Kim Gevaert in a time of 42.54 seconds, which set a new Belgian record.

Sport career

Borlée represented Belgium at the 2008 Summer Olympics in Beijing. She competed at the 4x100 metres relay together with Gevaert, Mariën and Ouédraogo. In their first round heat, they placed first in front of Great Britain, Brazil, and Nigeria. Their time of 42.92 seconds was the third fastest time overall out of sixteen participating nations. With this result, they qualified for the final in which they sprinted to a time of 42.54 seconds and 2nd place behind Russia but in front of Nigeria to take the silver medal, missing out on the gold medal by 0.23 seconds. However, one of the Russian runners, Yuliya Chermoshanskaya, was later found to have used two banned performance-enhancing drugs, resulting in the Russian team's disqualification, thereby promoting Belgium to the gold medal position. Borlée was officially presented with the gold medal eight years later on September 10, 2016.

Borlée represented Belgium at the 2016 Summer Olympics in Rio de Janeiro. She competed in the 200 metres event. She finished 7th in her heat with a time of 23.53 seconds. She did not qualify for the semifinals. She was the flag bearer for Belgium during the Parade of Nations. She retired after the Rio games.

Fashion career 
After retiring from professional sport, Borlée and Olympic teammate Elodie Ouedraogo teamed up again to found the sustainable sportswear brand 4254, named after their Olympic medal-winning time. The brand won the Emerging Talent of the Year at the 2018 Belgian Fashion Awards.

Borlée family

The progenitor of the Borlee family is Jacques, bronze medalist at the 1983 European Indoor Championships in Budapest on 200 m, while his first wife Edith Demaertelaere was a good sprinter with a personal best of 23.89. Six of his seven children are athletes (the first five born from the first marriage with Edith, the last two born from a second marriage).

The eldest daughter Olivia won the gold medal at the Olympics and the world bronze at the 2007 Osaka World Championships with the 4 × 100 m relay and the other daughter Alizia was also a decent sprinter. The four sons are all 400 m specialists, the twins Jonathan and Kevin, both Olympic finalists in London 2012, Dylan and the youngest Rayane. In addition, Jacques' older brother Jean-Pierre was also a sprinter.

Achievements

See also
 Borlée family

References

External links

Olivia Borlée at All-Athletics.com
Borlée's website

1986 births
Living people
People from Woluwe-Saint-Lambert
Belgian female sprinters
Olympic athletes of Belgium
Athletes (track and field) at the 2008 Summer Olympics
Athletes (track and field) at the 2016 Summer Olympics
Olympic gold medalists for Belgium
World Athletics Championships medalists
Medalists at the 2008 Summer Olympics
Walloon sportspeople
Olympic gold medalists in athletics (track and field)
Olympic female sprinters
Florida State Seminoles women's track and field athletes
Sportspeople from Brussels